The 1937–38 NHL season was the 21st season of the National Hockey League (NHL). Eight teams each played 48 games. The Chicago Black Hawks were the Stanley Cup winners as they beat the Toronto Maple Leafs three games to one in the Stanley Cup Finals.

League business
Bill Dwyer could not come up with the capital required to retain his team and the NHL took full control of the New York Americans.

The Howie Morenz Memorial Game, the NHL's second all-star game, was played November 2, 1937, and raised over $11,447, which, added to other contributions, established a fund of over $20,000 for the Morenz family. Prior to the start of the game, Howie Morenz's uniform and playing kit was auctioned and Joseph Cattarinich put down the winning bid of $500. The uniform was presented to Howie Morenz Jr. The NHL All-stars defeated a combined team of Canadiens and Maroons players 6–5.

In February 1938, NHL president Frank Calder terminated the professional-amateur agreement with the Canadian Amateur Hockey Association (CAHA) which limited signing contracts with junior ice hockey players. After a player suspended by the NHL was registered by a CAHA team, he met with CAHA vice-president W. G. Hardy without resolution, then told NHL teams that they could approach any junior player with a contract offer.

Rule changes
In September 1937, the NHL passed the 'icing' rule whereby teams could no longer shoot the puck the length of the ice to delay the game. Teams were allowed to continue to 'ice' the puck during penalties. The penalty shot was amended to remove the dots where the shot was to take place. Two new lines 30 feet from the goal were added instead. A player taking a penalty shot would start from the line closest to his own goal, skate with the puck and shoot before he crossed the penalty line nearest the opposition goal. After a puck was shot out-of-bounds, the location of the following faceoff was now to occur at the point where the shot was made, instead of where it exited the rink as was done until that time.

Regular season
Charlie Conacher was named captain of the Toronto Maple Leafs, and he had a big weekend at the expense of Chicago November 13 with a hat trick in a 7–3 win. He then scored 2 goals in a 3–3 tie. However, The Big Bomber ran into misfortune once more on November 18 in Montreal against the Canadiens when he dislocated his shoulder. The cycle of injuries had a cumulative effect on Conacher's nervous and physical condition and his doctor told him to retire from hockey. He did retire for the rest of the season, but would play again the next season, but was forever gone from the Leafs.

The New York Rangers lost their star center Neil Colville for a few games as the result of some horseplay that must have infuriated Lester Patrick. Defenceman Joe Cooper was pursuing a fad of slicing off neckties from teammates using a penknife. Colville threw up his hand only to receive a gash that required 11 stitches to close.

The New York Americans, with Ching Johnson and Hap Day to relieve Joe Jerwa and Al Murray on defence, were doing much better than usual. Earl Robertson, their new goaltender, was leading the Canadian Division in goaltending and ended up doing so at season's end. The Amerks also had Sweeney Schriner and Nels Stewart contributing in a nice way to the offence.

The Montreal Maroons, coached at first by King Clancy, settled into last place and president and general manager Tommy Gorman decided he would take over as coach. He did even worse and the fans stayed away. Although the team did badly, one highlight was an 11–7 win over their rivals, the Canadiens, and Baldy Northcott had a hat trick in the game. There seemed to be nothing Gorman could do to revitalize the team and at one stretch the team lost 8 straight games. On March 17, 1938, the Maroons played their last game against their rivals, the Canadiens.

Detroit was the shockingly bad team of the American Division. After winning the Stanley Cup in 1937, they were reclining in the cellar of the Division. They had one bright moment when Carl Liscombe set a record for the fastest hat trick to this time (since broken by Bill Mosienko). Liscombe scored three goals in 1 minute and 52 seconds in a 5–1 win over Chicago.

On March 17, 1938, Nels Stewart scored his 300th National Hockey League goal in a 5–3 loss to the Rangers.

Final standings

Playoffs
The Cinderella story of the century was the Chicago Black Hawks who would barely make the playoffs but proceeded to defeat the Canadiens, the Americans and the Maple Leafs to win the Cup with the lowest regular-season winning percentage of any champions in the four major professional sports leagues of North America.

Playoff bracket

Quarterfinals
The New York Americans stunned the New York Rangers as Lorne Carr scored the winner in overtime in the third and deciding game.

The Canadiens beat the Hawks in game one of the quarterfinal, as Toe Blake had the hat trick. But Mike Karakas shut out the Canadiens in the second game and even though Georges Mantha appeared to win the game with a freak goal in game three, Earl Seibert kept the Hawks from losing with a goal late in the game, and then the Hawks won the series in overtime.

Semifinals
In an upset, the Toronto Maple Leafs beat Boston in the Series A semifinal.

In the Series B semifinal, it was Chicago and the New York Americans, who beat Chicago in game one 3–1. Game two was a great goaltenders battle between Mike Karakas and Earl Robertson. It appeared that the Americans were headed to their first Stanley Cup final when Nels Stewart scored with seconds left in the game, but referee Clarence Campbell disallowed the goal, saying Eddie Wiseman was in the goal crease. Cully Dahlstrom scored the goal that saved the Black Hawks. In New York, the deciding game saw Alex Levinsky of Chicago score the go-ahead goal, but the red light did not go on. Investigation revealed that fans were holding the goal judge's hand so he could not signal the goal. Although the Amerks came close, they were unable to tie the score and the Black Hawks were in the finals.

Stanley Cup Finals

European tour

After the Stanley Cup final finished, the Detroit Red Wings and the Montreal Canadiens played a nine-game exhibition series in Europe, becoming the first NHL teams to play outside North America. Six games were played in the United Kingdom, three in France. The Canadiens won the series with a record of 5–3–1.

Awards

Player statistics

Scoring leaders
Note: GP = Games played, G = Goals, A = Assists, PTS = Points, PIM = Penalties in minutes

Source: NHL

Leading goaltenders
Cecil Tiny Thompson 1:80 Gaa Bos
Dave Kerr New York R 1:95 Gaa
Earl Robertson New York Americans 2:22
Wilf Cude Montreal Canadiens 2:53
Turk Broda Toronto Maple Leafs  2:56
Norm Smith Detroit 2:66
Mike Karakas Chicago 2:80
Bill Beveridge Montreal Maroons 3:00

Coaches

American Division
Boston Bruins: Art Ross
Chicago Black Hawks: Bill Stewart
Detroit Red Wings: Jack Adams
New York Rangers: Lester Patrick

Canadian Division
Montreal Canadiens: Cecil Hart
Montreal Maroons: King Clancy and Tommy Gorman
New York Americans: Red Dutton
Toronto Maple Leafs: Dick Irvin

Debuts
The following is a list of players of note who played their first NHL game in 1937–38 (listed with their first team, asterisk(*) marks debut in playoffs):
Red Hamill, Boston Bruins
Mel Hill, Boston Bruins
Jack Crawford, Boston Bruins
Cully Dahlstrom, Chicago Black Hawks
Carl Liscombe, Detroit Red Wings
Dutch Hiller, New York Rangers
Murph Chamberlain, Toronto Maple Leafs

Last games
The following is a list of players of note that played their last game in the NHL in 1937–38 (listed with their last team):
Carl Voss, Chicago Black Hawks
Joe Lamb, Detroit Red Wings
Pit Lepine, Montreal Canadiens
Aurel Joliat, Montreal Canadiens
Marty Burke, Montreal Canadiens
Tom Cook, Montreal Maroons
Al Shields, Montreal Maroons
Hap Day, New York Americans
Hap Emms, New York Americans
Ching Johnson, New York Americans
Butch Keeling, New York Rangers

See also
1937-38 NHL transactions
List of Stanley Cup champions
National Hockey League All-Star Game
1937 in sports
1938 in sports

References
 
 
 
 
 
 

Notes

External links
Hockey Database
NHL.com

 
1937–38 in Canadian ice hockey by league
1937–38 in American ice hockey by league